Sari or Shari gan is a traditional form of folk music in Bangladesh are usually sung by boatmen and other workers groups. It is common for Sari gan to be sung during Nouka Baich competitions.

References

Bangladeshi music
Bengali music